The ING New England Golf Classic was an annual golf tournament for professional women golfers on the Futures Tour, the LPGA Tour's developmental tour. The event was played from 1999 to 2011 in the Hartford, Connecticut area.

Prior to 2009, the tournament had various title sponsors, most recently CIGNA, a health service company based in Philadelphia, Pennsylvania. The 2009 season opened with the tournament lacking a title sponsor. In mid-June 2009 it was announced that ING, a global financial institution, would become the new title sponsor.

The tournament was a 54-hole event, as are most Futures Tour tournaments, and includes pre-tournament pro-am opportunities, in which local amateur golfers can play with the professional golfers from the Tour as a benefit for local charities. The benefiting charity from the New England Golf Classic was Chip in for a Cure, a Connecticut-based breast cancer charity.

Tournament names through the years: 
1999: SNET Women's Classic
2000: Connecticut Futures Golf Classic
2001–2003: Lincoln Financial Futures Golf Classic
2004: GMAC Futures Golf Classic
2005–2008: CIGNA Golf Classic
2009–2011: ING New England Golf Classic

Winners

^Tournament shortened to 36 holes because of rain.
*Championship won in sudden-death playoff.

Tournament records

References

External links
Futures Tour official website
Blue Fox Run Golf Course official website
Gillette Ridge Golf Club official website
Wintonbury Hills Golf Course official website

Former Symetra Tour events
Golf in Connecticut
Sports in Hartford County, Connecticut
Sports competitions in Hartford, Connecticut
Recurring sporting events established in 1999
Recurring sporting events disestablished in 2011
1999 establishments in Connecticut
2011 disestablishments in Connecticut